Hunslet may refer to:

Places
Hunslet, an area in Leeds, UK
Hunslet Rural District
Rail transport
Hunslet-Barclay, former name of merged group of locomotive manufacturing companies - now split into Brush-Barclay and Hunslet Engine Company
Hunslet Engine Company, a locomotive manufacturer.
Hunslet Steam Company, a subsidiary
Leeds Hunslet Lane railway station
Hunslet Austerity 0-6-0ST, a steam shunting locomotive
NIR 101 Class, nicknamed Hunslets

Other
Hunslet R.L.F.C.